Self-deprecation, or self-depreciation, is the act of reprimanding oneself by belittling, undervaluing, disparaging oneself, or being excessively modest. It can be used as a way to make complaints, express modesty, invoke optimal reactions or add humour. It may also be used as a way for individuals to appear more likable and agreeable.  Self-deprecation often reflects low self-esteem and is associated with depression and anxiety and has become increasingly popular on social media, especially among Gen Z.

’Self-deprecation’ is more properly ‘self-depreciation’, since the former (from Latin precari prayer) means ‘to pray against oneself’ and the latter (from Latin precium value) means to devalue oneself.

Purposes

Self-defense 
Self-deprecation was recommended by philosophers of Stoicism as a response to insults. Instead of getting defensive, people should join in by insulting themselves even more. According to the Stoics, this will remove the sting from the insult. It will also disappoint the interlocutor because the person failed to show upset in response to words that were supposed to hurt them, thereby reducing the chance that they will try to upset the person like that again. People prefer self-criticism over being criticized by others.

However, researchers believe it can have an overall negative effect on users.  It can result in them feeling that they don't deserve praise and undermining their own authority.

Likability 
Engaging in self-deprecation allows individuals to appear more likable by showing off their flaws and deflecting praise.  People tend to have more negative impressions of individuals who seem boastful and who talk positively about themselves. They are often perceived as arrogant, but this doesn't occur when one describes themselves in a negative way. A person might self-deprecate after achieving something in fear of their accomplishment threatening the self-concept of others. People with higher statuses (i.e., is wealthy, has many accomplishments, are physically attractive) are perceived more positively if they self-deprecate by highlighting their own personal flaws and downplay their successes.

Politeness 
In traditional British-English culture, self-deprecation is considered to be an element of modesty. Modesty is considered a virtue, often contrasted to the North American demonstration of self-confidence, often taken for boasting. This is characteristic such as in the United Kingdom, Ireland, Australia and New Zealand, where "blowing one's own trumpet" is frowned upon. In stereotypical English behavior, belittling themselves means appearing polite by putting someone else first.

Comedy 
Self-deprecation is seen as a major component of the comedy of many North American comedians such as Rodney Dangerfield, Woody Allen, Nathan Fielder,  Don Knotts, Joan Rivers, etc.

In social media 
Since the rise of social media, self-deprecating humor has become increasingly popular on certain social media platforms such as Instagram, Twitter and TikTok, especially among Gen Z.  This phenomenon can also be observed among millennials who find satisfaction in self-humiliation.  Self-deprecating jokes typically revolve about feeling dead inside, having a mental illness or about people blaming themselves for anything bad that happens in their life. These posts tend to be more popular because it allows users to not feel alone in not being able to live a perfect life.  According to the American Psychological Association, 91% of Gen Z between ages 18-21 in the last month have experienced at least one physical or emotional symptom due to stress. This statistic is the highest rate ever recorded, demonstrating the increase of mental health issues that Gen Z experiences.  In return, users turn to self-deprecating memes on social media to cope.

Social media can be public yet personal and has norms most users follow to avoid being criticized.  These types of self-deprecating jokes can let people feel free from the pressure of needing to appear perfect. It lets users display their less-desirable traits or habits while preventing feelings of embarrassment.

Boasting on social media, just like in real life, is often perceived negatively and is another reason why users gravitate towards self-deprecation to appear more likable.  People also tend to like a person more if positive information about them is presented by a third party rather than from themselves, even if it is the same information. Furthermore, using self-deprecating hash tags allows individuals to be perceived as less arrogant and more humorous.

See also
 Guilty pleasure
 Ingratiation
 Peer pressure
 Self-criticism
 Self-hatred
 Social awkwardness
 Toxic positivity

References

Humour
Conformity
Ego psychology